The gauge (or commonly bore in British English) of a firearm is a unit of measurement used to express the inner diameter (bore diameter) of the barrel.

Gauge is determined from the weight of a solid sphere of lead that will fit the bore of the firearm and is expressed as the multiplicative inverse of the sphere's weight as a fraction of a pound, e.g., a one-twelfth pound lead ball fits a 12-gauge bore. Thus there are twelve 12-gauge balls per pound, etc. The term is related to the measurement of cannon, which were also measured by the weight of their iron round shot; an 8-pounder would fire an 8 lb (3.6 kg) ball.

Gauge is commonly used today in reference to shotguns, though historically it was also used in large double rifles, which were made in sizes up to 2 bore during their heyday in the 1880s, being originally loaded with black powder cartridges. These very large rifles, called "elephant guns", were intended for use primarily in Africa and Asia for hunting large dangerous game.

Gauge is abbreviated "ga.", "ga", or "G".

Calculating gauge
An n-gauge diameter means that a ball of lead (density 11.34 g/cm3 or 0.4097 lb/in3) with that diameter has a mass equal to  part of the mass of the international avoirdupois pound (approx. 454 grams), that is, that n such lead balls could be cast from a pound weight of lead. Therefore, an n-gauge shotgun or n-bore rifle has a bore diameter (in inches) of approximately

 

Explanation:

 Divide 1 pound by n to find the mass of each one of the balls
 Divide it by 0.4097 lb/in3 (density of lead) to find the volume of each ball
 Multiply it by 2 to change from radius to diameter

This simplifies to the following formula for the internal diameter of the barrel of an n-gauge shotgun:

Likewise, given the diameter in inches, the gauge is
 

The gauge of firearms is determined by: 1 pound/gauge = weight of lead sphere. Caliber of the bore is then measured. This is essential information for understanding gauges.

Bore sizing

Since shotguns were not originally intended to fire solid projectiles, but rather a compressible mass of shot, the actual diameter of the bore can vary. The fact that most shotgun bores are not cylindrical also causes deviations from the ideal bore diameter.

The chamber of the gun is larger, to accommodate the thickness of the shotshell walls, and a "forcing cone" in front of the chamber reduces the diameter down to the bore diameter. The forcing cone can be as short as a fraction of an inch, or as long as a few inches on some guns. At the muzzle end of the barrel, the choke can constrict the bore even further, so measuring the bore diameter of a shotgun is not a simple process, as it must be done away from either end.

Shotgun bores are commonly "overbored" or "backbored", meaning that most of the bore (from the forcing cone to the choke) is slightly larger than the value given by the formula. This is claimed to reduce felt recoil and improve patterning. The recoil reduction is due to the larger bore producing a slower acceleration of the shot, and the patterning improvements are due to the larger muzzle diameter for the same choke constriction, which results in less shot deformation. Once only found in expensive custom shotguns, overbored barrels are now becoming common in mass-marketed guns. Aftermarket backboring is also commonly done to reduce the weight of the barrel, and move the center of mass backward for a better balance. Factory overbored barrels generally are made with a larger outside diameter, and will not have this reduction in weight—though the factory barrels will be tougher, since they have a normal barrel wall thickness.

Firing slugs from overbored barrels can result in very inconsistent accuracy, as the slug may be incapable of obturating to fill the oversized bore.

Gauges in use

The six most common shotgun gauges, in descending order of size, are the 10 gauge, 12 gauge, 16 gauge, 20 gauge, 28 gauge, and .410 bore. By far the most popular is the 12 gauge, particularly in the United States. The 20-gauge shotgun is the next most popular size being favored by shooters uncomfortable with the weight and recoil of a 12-gauge gun, and is popular for upland game hunting. The next most popular sizes are 28 gauge and .410 bore. Both the 10 gauge and 16 gauge, while less common, are still available.

Shotguns and shells exceeding 10 gauge, such as the 8, 6, and 4 gauge, are historically important in the United Kingdom and elsewhere in mainland Europe. Today, they are rarely manufactured. Shells are usually black powder paper cartridges as opposed to the plastic or wax cartridge and smokeless powder of today.

The 18, 15, 11, 6, 3, and 2-gauge shells are the rarest of all; owners of these types of rare shotguns will usually have their ammunition custom loaded by a specialist in rare and custom bores. The 14 gauge has not been loaded in the United States since the early 1900s, although the  hull is still made in France. The very small 24 and 32 gauges are still produced and used in some European and South American countries. Punt guns are rarely encountered.

Also seen in limited numbers are smoothbore firearms in calibers smaller than .360 such as .22 Long Rifle (UK No. 1 bore) and 9mm Flobert rimfire (UK No. 3 bore), designed for short-range pest control and garden guns. The No. 2 bore (7 mm) has long been obsolete. All three of these rimfires are available in shot and BB-cap.

Gauge and shot type

The 10 gauge narrowly escaped obsolescence when steel and other nontoxic shot became required for waterfowl hunting, since the larger shell could hold the much larger sizes of low-density steel shot needed to reach the ranges necessary for waterfowl hunting.  The move to steel shot reduced the use of 16 and 20 gauges for waterfowl hunting, and the smaller, 12-gauge shells as well. However, the  12-gauge shell, with its higher SAAMI pressure rating compared to standard 12-gauge guns, began to approach the performance of the 10-gauge loads. Newer nontoxic shots, such as bismuth and tungsten-nickel-iron alloys, and even tungsten-polymer blends, regain much or all of the performance loss, but are much more expensive than steel or lead shot. However, laboratory research indicates that tungsten alloys can actually be quite toxic internally.

Sizes found in the United Kingdom
Legend: left side is bore size, right side is case length.

4 bore: 
8 bore: 
10 bore: 
12 bore: 
14 bore: 
16 bore: 
20 bore: 
24 bore: 
28 bore: 
32 bore: 
.410 bore: 
.360 bore: 
9 mm (No. 3 bore) rimfire [0.5 in], 9 mm (No. 3 bore) long rimfire [1.4 in] 
7 mm (No. 2 bore) rimfire  
6 mm (No. 1 bore) short rimfire, 6 mm (No. 1 bore) long rimfire

Conversion guide

The table below lists various gauge sizes with weights. The bores marked * are found in punt guns and rare weapons only. However, 4 gauge were sometimes found used in blunderbuss guns made for coach defense and protection against piracy. The .410 and 23 mm are exceptions; they are actual bore sizes, not gauges. If the .410 and 23 mm were measured traditionally, they would be 67.62 gauge and 6.278 gauge, respectively.

Note: Use of this table for estimating bullet masses for historical large-bore rifles is limited, as this table assumes the use of round ball, rather than conical bullets; for example, a typical 4-bore rifle from circa 1880 used a  bullet, or sometimes slightly heavier, rather than using a  round lead ball. (Round balls give progressively much worse external ballistic performance than conical bullets at ranges greater than about ) In contrast, a 4-bore express rifle often used a  bullet wrapped in paper to keep lead buildup to a minimum in the barrel. In either case, assuming a 4-ounce mass for a 4-bore rifle bullet from this table would be inaccurate, although indicative.

References

Shotgun shells
Units of length